The 191st Pennsylvania House of Representatives District is located in Delaware County and Philadelphia County and includes the following areas:

 Delaware County
 Yeadon (PART, Precincts 01, 04, 06, 07 and 09)
 Philadelphia (PART)
 Ward 03
 Ward 40 [PART, Divisions 02, 03, 04, 05, 06, 07, 08, 09, 10, 11, 12, 13, 14, 19, 20, 21, 23, 24, 25, 26, 33, 34 and 47]
 Ward 51 [PART, Divisions 01, 23, 25 and 27]
 Ward 60 [PART, Divisions 07, 19 and 22]
It has been represented by Democrat Joanna McClinton since 2015, who has also served as the Speaker of the House of Representatives since 2023.

Representatives

References

Government of Delaware County, Pennsylvania
Government of Philadelphia
191